Mark Baker is an American politician and Republican member of the Wyoming House of Representatives, representing the 60th district since January 4, 2021. Baker previously served as a representative from the 48th district from January 8, 2013, until his resignation on May 15, 2017.

Elections

2012 
Challenging incumbent Democratic Representative Joseph M. Barbuto for the District 48 seat, Baker was unopposed for the August 21, 2012 Republican Primary, winning with 374 votes, and won the November 6, 2012 General election with 1,723 votes (49.5%) against Barbuto.

2014
Baker faced a rematch against former Democratic Representative Joseph M. Barbuto.  Baker ran unopposed in the Republican primary and defeated Barbuto by 27 votes, taking 50.4% of the vote.

2016
Baker ran unopposed in the Republican primary, and defeated Democratic Western Wyoming Community College administrator Jackie Freeze with 58.3% of the vote.

References

External links
Official page at the Wyoming Legislature
 

Place of birth missing (living people)
Year of birth missing (living people)
Living people
Republican Party members of the Wyoming House of Representatives
People from Rock Springs, Wyoming
21st-century American politicians